Earthlight is a 1955 novel by Arthur C. Clarke.

Earthlight may also refer to:

 Earthlight (astronomy), the partial illumination of the dark portion of the moon's surface by light reflected from the Earth
 "Earthlight" (short story), a 1951 story by Arthur C. Clarke, expanded into the 1955 novel
 Earthlight (video game), a 1988 scrolling shooter published by Firebird
 Earthlight, a discontinued UK science fiction imprint of the publisher Simon & Schuster
 Earthlight (crater), a small crater near the Apollo 15 landing site on the moon
 Earthlight (horse), an Irish-bred, French-trained Thoroughbred racehorse

See also 
 Earthquake light, an unusual luminous aerial phenomenon that reportedly appears in the sky near areas of seismic activity
 Will-o'-the-wisp, an atmospheric ghost light seen by travellers at night